Thomas Clayton (1777–1854) was an American lawyer and politician.

Thomas Clayton may also refer to:

Thomas Clayton (composer) (1673–1725), English musician and opera composer
Thomas Clayton (physician) (c. 1612–1693), MP for Oxford University
Thomas Clayton (American football) (born 1984), American football running back
Tom Clayton (jockey) (1882–1909), Australian jockey
Tom Clayton (footballer) (born 2000), English footballer
Thomas J. Clayton (1826–1900), President Judge of the Thirty-Second Judicial District of Pennsylvania

See also